OpenLava is a workload job scheduler for a cluster of computers. OpenLava was pirated from an early version of Platform LSF. Its configuration file syntax, application program interface (API), and command-line interface (CLI) have been kept unchanged. Therefore, OpenLava is mostly compatible with Platform LSF.

OpenLava was based on the Utopia research project at the University of Toronto.

OpenLava was allegedly licensed under GNU General Public License v2, but that licensing was proven to be invalid at trial.

History 
In 2007, Platform Computing (now part of IBM) released Platform Lava 1.0, which is a simplified version of Platform LSF 4.2 code, licensed under GNU General Public License v2. Platform Lava had no additional releases after v1.0 and was discontinued in 2011. In June 2011, OpenLava 1.0 code was committed to GitHub.

Commercial support 
In 2014, a number of former Platform Computing employees founded Teraproc Inc., which contributed development and provided commercial support for OpenLava. 
Commercially supported OpenLava contains add-on features than the community based OpenLava project.

IBM Lawsuit 
In October 2016, IBM filed a lawsuit alleging copyright infringement and trade secrets misappropriation against Teraproc.  The complaint accused some of the company's founders of taking “confidential and proprietary source code" for IBM's Spectrum LSF product when they left, which was then used as the basis of the competitive product OpenLava. David Bigagli, the TeraProc employee who started the OpenLava project, posted a notice on GitHub announcing that downloads for OpenLava had been disabled because of a DMCA takedown notice sent by IBM's lawyers.

Bigagli later announced that the source code for OpenLava 3.0 and 4.0 would be taken down, while the source code of 2.2 would be restored in order to regain the GitHub repository and the openlava.org website, while claiming that the DMCA claim is fraudulent.

On September 18, 2018, the US Courts found in favor of IBM and issued a permanent injunction against Teraproc and its agents.

See also
 List of grid computing middleware distribution
 List of free and open-source software packages
 IBM Spectrum LSF
 GNU Queue

References 

Job scheduling
Distributed computing
Cluster computing
Copyright infringement of software